The 2000–01 Maltese Premier League (known as the Rothmans Premier League for sponsorship reasons) was the 21st season of the Maltese Premier League, and the 86th season of top-tier football in Malta. The league started on 19 August 2000 with Birkirkara as the defending champions after their first title in the previous season.

Teams 

The following teams were promoted from the First Division at the start of the season:
 Ħamrun Spartans
 Xgħajra Tornadoes

From the previous Premier League season, the following teams were relegated to the First Division:
 Gozo
 Żurrieq

First phase

League table

Results

Second phase

Top Six 

The teams placed in the first six positions in the league table qualified for the Top Six, and the points obtained during the first phase were halved (and rounded up) before the start of second phase. As a result, the teams started with the following points before the second phase: Valletta 21 points, Sliema Wanderers 20, Birkirkara 19, Hibernians 18, Floriana 17 and Ħamrun Spartans 13.

Play-out 

The teams which finished in the last four league positions were placed in the play-out and at the end of the phase the two lowest-placed teams were relegated to the First Division. The points obtained during the first phase were halved (and rounded up) before the start of second phase. As a result, the teams started with the following points before the second phase: Pietà Hotspurs 9 points, Naxxar Lions 6, Rabat Ajax 5, Xgħajra Tornadoes 1.

Season statistics

Top scorers

Hat-tricks

References

External links 
 Official website

Maltese Premier League seasons
Malta
1